Bossangoa Airport  is an airport serving Bossangoa, a city in the Ouham prefecture of the Central African Republic. The airport is on the west side of the city.

See also

Transport in the Central African Republic
List of airports in the Central African Republic

References

External links 
OpenStreetMap - Bossangoa
OurAirports - Bossangoa

Airports in the Central African Republic
Buildings and structures in Ouham